The Faroese People's Party – Radical Self-Government is a pro-Faroese independence conservative and conservative-liberal political party on the Faroe Islands led by Beinir Johannesen.  One of the four major parties, it has had eight seats in the Løgting since the 2019 election, making it the joint-largest party, but it has neither of the Faroes' seats in the Folketing.

Founded in 1939 as a split from the Self-Government Party and by former members of the Business Party (Vinnuflokkurin), the party has traditionally supported greater autonomy for the Faroe Islands.  Party leader Hákun Djurhuus served as Prime Minister from 1963 to 1967, as did Jógvan Sundstein from 1989 to 1991.  In 1998, it adopted a policy of full independence from Denmark as part of a coalition deal in which leader Anfinn Kallsberg became PM.  From 2004 until 2011, except for a short period in 2008, the party has been in coalition with the Union Party and Social Democratic Party, who want to maintain the political status quo. Since November 2011 the party has been in a coalition with the Union Party (Sambandsflokkurin), the Centre Party (Miðflokkurin) and until September 2013 also with the Self-Government Party (Sjálvstýrisflokkurin), who left the coalition after their minister had been sacked.

The party was a member of the European Conservatives and Reformists Party until 2022. The party is affiliated to the International Democrat Union.

History

The party was founded in 1939 as Vinnuflokkurin. The party split from the Self-Government Party over land reform, and maintained a policy of economic liberalisation and social conservatism, with the party's support based in the fishing industry and private business. The party's economic programme was one of exploitation of local resources to reduce dependence on Denmark, and success of the Sjóvinnubankin was utilised by the party to demonstrate that the Faroes could be economically self-sustaining.  The party was given its current name in 1940. In the 1943 Faroese election, the party won 12 out of 25 seats: one short of an overall majority.

The People's Party entered a coalition government with the Social Democratic Party in 1990, breaking the cycle of centre-right and centre-left coalitions. The party withdrew in 1993, being replaced by left-wing parties.  In the 1994 Faroese election, the party lost over a quarter of its vote, remaining outside government.  However, it did return in 1996, this time with the Union Party, the Self-Government Party, and the Labour Front.

In the election in 1998, the party bounced back to its pre-1994 position, and entered into a cross-spectrum coalition with the Republican Party and the Self-Government Party, under which the People's Party adopted a policy of seeking independence.  The independence plan failed in 2001, after Denmark threatened to cut economic assistance earlier than anticipated.  In the following year's election, the party remained on 21% of the vote, and stayed in a renewed coalition that also included the Centre Party.

When chairman Anfinn Kallsberg decided not to run for re-election, a new election was slated. There were two candidates, former minister of Fishery, Jørgen Niclasen, and current minister of Industry, Bjarni Djurholm. The election on 2 August 2007 gave Jørgen Niclasen the majority of the votes, making him the new party chairman.  In the Danish parliamentary elections of 2007 the party received 20.5% of the Faroese vote (down from the 24.1% it had won in 2005) and lost the seat it had previously held in the Danish national Folketing.  At the 2008 Faroese election, the party won 20.1% of the popular vote and seven out of 33 seats.

In early elections in 2011, the party won eight seats. In 2013 Janus Rein, who was elected for Progress, joined the Peoples Party after being a member of the Løgting without any political membership for eleven months. After this event, the Peoples Party has 9 of the 33 members of the Løgting.

At the general election 2015, the party lost two seats, they got 18.9% of the votes and 6 members. Eight days after the election, Annika Olsen who had received 961 personal votes, left the People's Party, which means that the party lost one member and now has 5 parliament members. On 4 February 2016 she became a member of the People's Party again.

Ideology
Generally, the party is liberal conservative. In economics, the party is supportive of the economic liberalism.

The party supports Faroese independence from Denmark. It is one of two major parties (along with Republic) whose primary concern was historically the constitutional issue, rather than economics.

Election results

Leaders

Chairmen

Current members of the Løgting 

As of the 2022 general snap election:

Footnotes

References

External links
 Official web site

Political parties in the Faroe Islands
Liberal conservative parties
Conservative parties in Denmark
Separatism in Denmark
Secessionist organizations in Europe
Faroese nationalism
Social conservative parties
Eurosceptic parties in Denmark